Nazma Anwar ( – 14 December 2004) was a Bangladeshi film and television actress, and drama activist. She performed in Bengali films including Hajar Bachhor Dhore (2005), Dukhai (1997) Joyjatra (2004), Shonkhonil Karagar (1992), Chittagong: The Last Stopover (2000), Shankhonad (2004) and also in television drama plays including Iblish, Kothao Keu Nei, and Tahara.

Early life
Anwar was born in 1941 in Munshiganj District in the-then British India. Her father was a professor of Arabic in the Government Haraganga College. She moved to Dhaka with her family when while she finished her sixth grade in school.

Career
Anwar started her career as a theater activist by joined Dhaka Drama Circle in 1960s. In 1981, she joined in Aranyak Natyadal, a  theater group in Bangladesh.

In 2001, she played in the tele drama Kariman Bewa (2001), based on the biography of freedom fighter Taramon Bibi.

Personal life
Anwar had five children.
Her daughter, Ishrat Nishat (d. 2020), was a theatre activist.

Works
Films
 Shonkhonil Karagar (1992)
 Dukhai (1997)
 Chittagong: The Last Stopover (2000)
 Joyjatra (2004)
 Shankhonad (2004)
 Hajar Bachhor Dhore (2005)

References

External links

1940s births
2004 deaths
People from Munshiganj District
Bangladeshi film actresses
Bangladeshi theatre people
Date of birth missing